August 21 - Eastern Orthodox liturgical calendar - August 23

All fixed commemorations below are observed on September 4 by Orthodox Churches on the Old Calendar.

For August 22, Orthodox Churches on the Old Calendar commemorate the Saints listed on August 9.

Feasts

 Afterfeast of the Dormition.

Saints

 Martyrs Agathonicus of Nicomedia and his companions:
 Zoticus, Theoprepius, Acindynus, Severian, Zeno, and others, who suffered under Maximian (4th century)
 Hieromartyr Athanasius, Bishop of Tarsus in Cilicia, by beheading (c. 257)
 Saint Anthusa of Seleucia (298), and Martyrs Charesimus and Neophytus (c. 253-259)
 Martyrs Irenaeus, Or, and Oropsus.
 Martyr Julian of Heliopolis in Syria (c. 362)
 Saint Ariadne (515), daughter of Emperor Leo I.

Pre-Schism Western saints

 Saint Antoninus of Rome, a converted executioner in Rome (186)
 Saint Symphorian of Autun, martyred for refusing to sacrifice to a pagan goddess (2nd century)
 Saint Hippolytus of Porto, Bishop of Porto in Italy, martyred by drowning under Alexander (236)
 Hieromartyr Maurus, and Companions, a group of fifty martyrs in Rheims in France (260)
 Saints Fabrician and Philibert, martyrs in Toledo in Spain.
 Saints Martial, Saturninus, Epictetus, Maprilis, Felix and Companions, martyrs with St. Aurea of Ostia, honoured in Ostia, Italy (c. 300)
 Virgin Martyr Eulalia of Barcelona (303)  (see also: December 10)
 Saint Timothy, a martyr in Rome under Diocletian (c. 306)
 Saint Gunifort, a pilgrim, perhaps from England, who was martyred in Pavia in Italy.
 Saint Sigfrid, Abbot of Wearmouth (c. 688)
 Saint Ethelgitha, Abbess of a convent in Northumbria (c. 720)
 Saint Andrew of Tuscany (c. 880)
 Saint Arnulf of Eynesbury, saintly hermit, whose relics were venerated in Arnulphsbury or Eynesbury in Cambridgeshire, England (9th century)

Post-Schism Orthodox saints

 Saint Bogolep of St. Paisius of Uglich Monastery (16th century)
 Venerable Isaac I (Antimonov, the "Elder"), Schema-Archimandrite of Optina Monastery (1894)

New martyrs and confessors

 Ephraim (Kuznetsov), Bishop of Selenginsk, and Priest John Vostorgov (1918)
 Macarius (Gnevushev), Bishop of Orel, and Priests John Boyarshinov and Alexis Naumov (1918)
 Theodore (Smirnov), Bishop of Penza, and with him Priests Basil Smirnov and Gabriel Archangelsky (1937)
 John (Troyansky), Bishop of Veliki Luki (1937)
 Alexis (Orlov), Archbishop of Omsk (1937)
 Andrew (Ukhtomsky), Archbishop of Ufa and Menzelin (1937)
 Hierotheus (Glazkov), Hieromonk, of Lyubim (Yaroslasvl) (1937)
 John (Laba) and Hilarion (Tsurikov), Hieromonks, of Mirzoyan (Kazakhstan) (1937)
 Alexander Ratkovsky, Michael Lyubertsev and Theodore Malyarovsky, Priests (1937)
 New Hieromartyr Gorazd (Pavlík), Bishop of Prague, Bohemia and Moravo-Cilezsk, slain by Nazis (1942)

Other commemorations

 Synaxis of Panagia Proussiotissa (Mother of God of Proussa) in Evrytania, Greece (c. 829–842)
 Georgian Icon (Iveron Icon, Iverskaya) of the Most Holy Theotokos, at the Monastery of St. Alexis of Moscow (1650)

Icon gallery

Notes

References

Sources
 August 22 / September 4. Orthodox Calendar (PRAVOSLAVIE.RU).
 September 4 / August 22. Holy Trinity Russian Orthodox Church (A parish of the Patriarchate of Moscow).
 August 22. OCA - The Lives of the Saints.
 The Autonomous Orthodox Metropolia of Western Europe and the Americas (ROCOR). St. Hilarion Calendar of Saints for the year of our Lord 2004. St. Hilarion Press (Austin, TX). p. 62.
 Menologion: The Twenty-Second Day of the Month of August. Orthodoxy in China.
 August 22. Latin Saints of the Orthodox Patriarchate of Rome.
 The Roman Martyrology. Transl. by the Archbishop of Baltimore. Last Edition, According to the Copy Printed at Rome in 1914. Revised Edition, with the Imprimatur of His Eminence Cardinal Gibbons. Baltimore: John Murphy Company, 1916. pp. 252–253.
 Rev. Richard Stanton. A Menology of England and Wales, or, Brief Memorials of the Ancient British and English Saints Arranged According to the Calendar, Together with the Martyrs of the 16th and 17th Centuries. London: Burns & Oates, 1892. pp. 404–410.

 Greek Sources
 Great Synaxaristes:  22 ΑΥΓΟΥΣΤΟΥ. ΜΕΓΑΣ ΣΥΝΑΞΑΡΙΣΤΗΣ.
  Συναξαριστής. 22 Αυγούστου. ECCLESIA.GR. (H ΕΚΚΛΗΣΙΑ ΤΗΣ ΕΛΛΑΔΟΣ).

 Russian Sources
  4 сентября (22 августа). Православная Энциклопедия под редакцией Патриарха Московского и всея Руси Кирилла (электронная версия). (Orthodox Encyclopedia - Pravenc.ru).

August in the Eastern Orthodox calendar